The 2010 UCI BMX World Championships took place in Pietermaritzburg, South Africa, and crowned world champions in the cycling discipline of BMX. For the first time, there were no titles awarded in the Cruiser class

Medal summary

References

External links

Union Cycliste Internationale website

UCI BMX World Championships
BMX World Championships
2010 in South African sport